Andrew Scheps is an American mix engineer, recording engineer, record producer, and record label owner, based in Los Angeles and the United Kingdom. He received Grammy Awards for Best Rock Album for his work on Red Hot Chili Peppers' Stadium Arcadium, Album of the Year for Adele's 21, and Best Reggae Album for Ziggy Marley's Fly Rasta.

Biography
A Long Island native who got his start playing jazz trumpet, Andrew Scheps has mixed records for artists such as the Red Hot Chili Peppers, Adele, Metallica, Jay-Z and many others. After graduating from the Recording Engineering Program at the University of Miami, he spent some time working for New England Digital as a field service technician for the Synclavier, one of the first digital synthesizers / samplers / workstations, then on the road with Stevie Wonder (as a keyboard tech) and Michael Jackson (mixing live sound), before settling in LA.

Having got into mixing a few years before the analog-to-digital revolution, Andrew worked with a collection of vintage gear at his Punkerpad West studio in Van Nuys, California, including a Neve Electronics BCM-10 with ten 1073s that were used for reference during the Waves Audio Scheps 73 plugin modeling process.

Scheps is known for his balanced, modern sounding and often loud mixes. In July 2015, while being interviewed on Pensado's Place, he declared to work completely "ITB" (in the box), which stands for working completely inside a computer, without the use of external gear. His 100% transition to ITB mixing occurred halfway through mixing the Hozier record in the summer of 2014. "Going back into the box wasn't a sonic decision, but I actually rediscovered that I really like it. It's great to be able to work on three or four songs at the same time. I have not gone back to working on the desk since then. While I miss some of the visceral hands-on aspects of the console, there is a lot of creative freedom working this way. It might seem like a drastic change, but it is only the tools that have changed: remarkably my philosophy and sound have stayed the same".

He is also the owner and president of Tonequake Records and Punkerpad UK (formerly Punker Pad West).

Grammy Awards 
 Ziggy Marley – Fly Rasta (Best Reggae Album)
 Adele – 21 (Album of the Year)
 Red Hot Chili Peppers – Stadium Arcadium (Best Rock Album)

Music education 
Scheps has been teaching week-long seminars in the south of France at studios La Fabrique where he shares his knowledge about his mixing, engineering and recording techniques as part of the "Mix With The Masters" program.

Discography
 Whiskey Myers - Tornillo (2022)
 Low Roar - Maybe Tomorrow (2021)
 Kaleo - Surface Sounds (2020)
 Apocalyptica - Cell-0 (2020)
 Low Roar - ross. (2019)
 Rival Sons - Feral Roots (2019)
 Hozier - Wasteland, Baby! (2019)
 My Brightest Diamond - A Million and One (2018)
 First Aid Kit - Tender Offerings (2018)
 Joyce Manor - Million Dollars to Kill Me (2018)
 Daughtry - Cage to Rattle (2018)
 Welles - "Seventeen" (2018)
 First Aid Kit - Ruins (2018)
 Low Roar - Once in a Long, Long While... (2017)
 Rancid - Trouble Maker (2017)
 Chase Rice - Lambs & Lions (2017)
 You Me at Six – Night People (2017)
 CRX – New Skin (2016)
 Kaleo - A/B (2016)
 Green Day - Revolution Radio (2016)
 The Heavy - Hurt and The Merciless - Counter Records/The Bad Son Recording Company (2016)
 Zac Brown Band - Jekyll & Hyde (2015)
 Amos Lee - Live at Red Rocks with the Colorado Symphony (2015)
 Farao - Till It's All Forgotten (2015)
 Plastiscines - Back to the Start (2014)
 Jennifer Nettles - That Girl (2014)
 Low Roar - 0 (2014)
 Hozier - Hozier (2014)
 Cinerama - Seven Wonders of the World (2014)
 Rodrigo Y Gabriela - 9 Dead Alive (2014)
 Ziggy Marley - Fly Rasta (2014)
 Red Hot Chili Peppers - "I'm Beside You" (2013)
 Jake Bugg - Shangri La (2013)
 AFI - Burials (2013)
 Gogol Bordello - Pura Vida Conspiracy (2013)
 Red Hot Chili Peppers - "This Is the Kitt" / "Brave from Afar" (2013)
 Lady Gaga - Artpop (2013)
 Black Sabbath - 13 (2013)
 Red Hot Chili Peppers - "In Love Dying" (2013)
 Red Hot Chili Peppers - "Hanelei" / "Open" / "Close" (2013)
 Bon Jovi - What About Now (2013)
 Chic Gamine - Closer (2013)
 Beyoncé - "Angel" (2013)
 Beyoncé - "XO" (2013)
 Red Hot Chili Peppers - "Pink as Floyd" / "Your Eyes Girl" (2013)
 Red Hot Chili Peppers - "Catch My Death" / "How It Ends" (2013)
 Special Request - Soul Music (2013)
 The Wedding Present - 4 Songs EP (2012)
 Lana Del Rey - Paradise (2012)
 Our Lady Peace - Heavyweight (2012)
 Our Lady Peace - As Fast as You Can (2012)
 Lana Del Rey - Born to Die (2012)
 Red Hot Chili Peppers - "Strange Man" / "Long Progression" (2012)
 The Hives - "Lex Hives" (2012)
 Red Hot Chili Peppers - "Magpies on Fire" / "Victorian" (2012)
 Red Hot Chili Peppers - "Never Is a Long Time" / "Love of Our Life" (2012)
 Richie Sambora - Aftermath of the Lowdown (2012)
 Red Hot Chili Peppers - "Brendan's Death Song" (2012)
 The Wedding Present - Valentina (2012)
 Red Hot Chili Peppers - "The Sunset Sleeps" / "Hometown Gypsy" (2012)
 Gogol Bordello - Моя Цыганиада (2011)
 Low Roar - Low Roar (2011)
 Red Hot Chili Peppers - "Look Around" (2011)
 The Duke Spirit - Bruiser (2011)
 Adele - 21 (2011)
 Red Hot Chili Peppers - "Monarchy of Roses" (2011)
 Red Hot Chili Peppers - "The Adventures of Rain Dance Maggie" (2011)
 Grace Potter and the Nocturnals - Grace Potter and the Nocturnals (2011)
 Wendy & Lisa - Snapshots (2011)
 Fdeluxe - Gaslight (2011)
 The Duke Spirit - Kusama EP (2010)
 Kid Rock - Born Free (2010)
 Gogol Bordello - trans-Continental Hustle (2010)
 Josh Groban - War at Home (2010)
 Gossip - Men in Love (2009)
 Gossip - Music for Men (2009)
 AFI - Crash Love (2009)
 Pilot Speed - Wooden Bones (2009)
 AFI - Mediate (2009)
 Metallica - Broken, Beat & Scarred (2009)
 Our Lady Peace - Burn Burn Burn (2009)
 Blood Red Shoes - Say Something, Say Anything (2008)
 Linkin Park - Songs from the Underground (2008)
 Cass McCombs - Dropping the Writ (2008)
 Weezer - Weezer (2008)
 Metallica - Death Magnetic (2008)
 Metallica - The Day That Never Comes (2008)
 Blood Red Shoes - You Bring Me Down (2008)
 Neil Diamond - Home Before Dark (2008)
 Blood Red Shoes- Box of Secrets (2007)
 The (International) Noise Conspiracy - The Cross of My Calling (2007)
 The Duke Spirit - You Really Wake Up the Love in Me (2007)
 Cass McCombs - That's That (2007)
 Nicole Atkins - Neptune City (2007)
 Blood Red Shoes - I Wish I Was Someone Better (2007)
 Manu Chao - La Radiolina (2007)
 Linkin Park - Minutes to Midnight (2007)
 Fightstar - We Apologize for Nothing (2007)
 Red Hot Chili Peppers - "Tell Me Baby" (2007)
 Neil Diamond - 12 Songs (2005)
 Red Hot Chili Peppers - "Snow (Hey Oh)" (2006)
 U2 - "Window in the Skies" (2006)
 Red Hot Chili Peppers - "Dani California" (2006)
 My Brightest Diamond - Bring Me the Workhorse (2006)
 Red Hot Chili Peppers - Stadium Arcadium (2006)
 Justin Timberlake - (Another Song) All Over Again (2006)
 Randy Coleman - Last Salutation (2005)
 The Picture - Connect (2005)
 The Mars Volta - Frances the Mute (2005)
 Rent- Selections of the Original Motion Picture Soundtrack (2005)
 Bette Midler - Sings the Peggy Lee Songbook (2005)
 The (International) Noise Conspiracy - Black M★sk (2004)
 The (International) Noise Conspiracy - A Small Demand (2004)
 Lil Jon & The East Side Boyz - Stop Fuckin Wit Me (2004)
 A Manual Dexterity: Soundtrack Volume One - Omar Rodríguez-López (2004)
 The Ben Taylor Band - Famous Among the Barns (2003)
 The Mars Volta - Inertiatic ESP (2003)
 Endo - Songs for the Restless (2003)
 Red Hot Chili Peppers - "Universally Speaking" (2003)
 Alien Ant Farm - TruANT (2003)
 Cash - Unearthed (2003)
 Limp Bizkit - Results May Vary (2003)
 Audioslave - "Cochise" (2003)
 The Mars Volta - De-Loused In The Comatorium (2003)
 Audioslave - "Like a Stone" (2003)
 Jay-Z - "99 Problems" (2003)
 The Mars Volta - Televators (2003)
 Jewel - 0304 (2003)
 Limp Bizkit - Eat You Alive (2003)
 Limp Bizkit - "Behind Blue Eyes" (2003)
 Johnny Cash - American IV: The Man Comes Around (2002)
 Andrew W.K. - We Want Fun (2002)
 Red Hot Chili Peppers - "The Zephyr Song" (2002)
 Audioslave - Audioslave (2002)
 Red Hot Chili Peppers - "By the Way" (2002)
 Alanis Morissette - Under Rug Swept (2002)
 Sum 41 - "It's What We're All About" (2002)
 Sheila Nicholls - Wake (2002)
 Alanis Morissette - Feast on Scraps (2002)
 Zeromancer - Clone Your Lover (2001)
 Iggy Pop - Shakin' All Over (1999)
 Põvi - Dragonflies (1999)
 Human Nature - Counting Down (1999)
 Põvi - Life in Volcanoes (1999)
 Pure Sugar - Hold on to My Love (1998)
 Taylor Dayne - Naked Without You (1998)
 Globe - Relation (1998)
 Robbie Robertson - Contact from the Underworld of Redboy (1998)
 David Holmes - Out of Sight (1998)
 Social Distortion - Live at the Roxy (1998)
 Michael Jackson - Ghost (1997)
 Quincy Jones - Q's Jook Joint (1995)
 Michael Jackson - HIStory - Past, Present and Future - Book I (1995)
 Kenny Loggins - Leap of Faith (1991)
 Diana Ross - The Force Behind the Power (1991)
 Jermaine Jackson - You Said (1991)
 KRU - Smile (1988)

References

External links 
 Andrew's Management
 Punkerpad West
 Tonequake Records

Year of birth missing (living people)
Living people
American audio engineers
Record producers from New York (state)
Grammy Award winners